Appleton's Magazine was an American magazine about books and literature. Founded by Seymour Eaton in 1903 as The Booklovers Magazine, it was purchased by D. Appleton & Company in 1904. Its name was changed to Appleton's Booklovers Magazine and finally to Appleton's Magazine. Publication ended in 1909. Its peak circulation was around 100,000 copies.

D. Appleton & Company had previously published a similar journal of literature, science and art called Appletons' Journal (1869–1881).

References

External links

Appleton's Magazine at Internet Archive (scanned books original editions color illustrated)
The Booklovers Magazine (1903–1905);  Appleton's Magazine (1906–1908) at HathiTrust

1903 establishments in New York (state)
1909 disestablishments in New York (state)
D. Appleton & Company books
Defunct literary magazines published in the United States
Magazines established in 1903
Magazines disestablished in 1909
Magazines published in New York City